Francisco Nitsche (4 November 1930 – 23 October 2018) was a Chilean footballer. He played in six matches for the Chile national football team from 1957 to 1965. He was also part of Chile's squad for the 1956 South American Championship.

References

External links
 
 

1930 births
2018 deaths
Chilean footballers
Chile international footballers
Place of birth missing
Association football goalkeepers
Unión Española footballers
Audax Italiano footballers